Southwaite railway station in Hesket parish, was situated on the Lancaster and Carlisle Railway (the West Coast Main Line) between Carlisle and Penrith. It served the village of Southwaite, Cumbria, England. The station opened in 1846, and closed on 7 April 1952.

Station buildings
The station had two platforms, an overbridge, a station hotel, railway cottages and a signal box. The station house remains as a private dwelling, however the platforms have been demolished. The line has been electrified.

Stations on the line
The next station on the line towards Carlisle was Wreay and the preceding station was Calthwaite.

References
Notes

Sources

External links
Old Cumbria Gazetteer

Disused railway stations in Cumbria
Railway stations in Great Britain opened in 1846
Railway stations in Great Britain closed in 1952
Former Lancaster and Carlisle Railway stations